The Battle of Mišar was fought between Serbian revolutionaries and an Ottoman army, it took place from 12 to 15 August 1806 during the First Serbian Uprising. After repulsing a Turkish force at Ivanovac the Serbian insurgents under Karađorđe took strong position, entrenched in sconces on the field of Mišar Hill, near Šabac west of Belgrade. For two consecutive days they faced costly assault by a Turkish army and its Bosnian allies. On the third day, the Serbian cavalry attacked and defeated the Turks, the insurgents then conquered the citadels of Šabac and Belgrade.

Prelude
The Ottoman army made its way towards occupied Belgrade. Karađorđe came to Mišar, and made his plans with the rest of the Serbian commanders. Karađorđe calculated the strategic position and decided that the sconce should be on top of Mišar Hill, on the field on the hill, between the river Sava, the wood and the villages Zabar, Jelenča and Mišar. The sconce was placed in a north-south direction with cannons placed at two of its corners. The fortress was made from earth in shape of a square with the northern side a little curved from the middle up to the gun position. It had a palisade as protection, and it had trenches around it. It had four cannons — one in a redan — and a place to put powder and ammunition. For four days, from Saturday to Thursday, there were smaller clashes with Ottoman scouts; the main engagement happened on Wednesday morning.

Battle
The fighting began on Mišar Hill, with an opening charge of the Ottoman sipahi cavalry followed by a charge of their infantry units led by the Bosnian captain Mehmed-beg Kulenović of Zvornik. The Serbian rebels made a sconce in the form of a square, which measured 300 x 280 m. The rebel leader Karađorđe remained in the fortifications to keep the morale of the men. The fortification had trenches around it. The plan consisted of Karađorđe and the infantry remaining in the fortification, while the Serbian cavalry led by Luka Lazarević and Miloš Obrenović would wait for the moment to attack. The Serbian rebel cavalry, intended as a reserve, were situated close to the ditch near the village of Žabar. The Serbian sharpshooters were divided into two lines on the sconce parapet, and beside them were two lines of men who loaded the muskets in the trench beside the parapet.

The Serbian shooters and gunners mowed down the first line of cavalry and panic struck the Ottoman lines when the horsemen retreated into the infantry led by Kulenović. However, the Ottomans soon regrouped and engaged the Serbian infantry. At one point Serbian soldiers panicked and retreated to the sconce fortress, but Karađorđe took his sabre and ordered them to get back to their posts. Then he signaled for the charge of the Serbian cavalry from the opposite ends with two simultaneous cannon shots. Kulenović and the remaining Ottoman troops continued asymmetric efforts against the advancements of the Serbian rebels. Then Luka Lazarević charged with the cavalry, broke the Ottoman line, and the cavalry divided into two parts. One part charged boldly on Ottoman artillery. The first rank was killed, but the rest killed all the artillerymen, and arrived at the Ottoman headquarters, where chief-in-command Sulejman Pasha Skopljak was celebrating too soon. The fights at Mišar lasted several days with mutual losses, but the battle itself ended with the collapse of the Ottoman center and the exposure of the right and left columns. Kulenović and his Bosnian troops were killed on the battlefield. Some Serbian sources say that Kulenović was slain in a duel with Luka Lazarević, in which Luka was wounded. Other sources say that Kulenović was killed by riflemen who ambushed him after the duel. The remaining Ottoman Bosnian army fled in panic from the battlefield. Some crossed Drina, some were killed, and some crossed Sava.

Aftermath and legacy
The battle forced the Ottomans into retreat and provided a significant military and morale victory for the Serbian rebels.

A monument was erected in the village of Mišar commemorating the victory.

Mehmed-beg Kulenović is the central figure in Filip Višnjić's epic poem Boj na Mišaru ("Battle of Mišar"), in which Mehmed-beg's wife waits for news to be brought to her from the battlefield by two ravens.

Gallery

See also 

 Battle of Bratačića

References

Sources
 
 Leopold Ranke, Die Serbische Revolution pages 86–87.
 Tošković, J.B. (1930) Odnosi između Bosne i Srbije 1805-1806 i boj na Mišaru. Subotica

Misar
Battles involving Bosnian militia (Ottoman)
Misar
Conflicts in 1806
First Serbian Uprising
1806 in Europe
August 1806 events
Šabac